Lake McConnell was a very large proglacial lake that existed in what is now Canada from 11,800 to 8,300 years ago. Other sources give starting and ending dates of about 12,000 and between 9,000 and 8,000 years ago, respectively. "Lake McConnell (or its smaller predecessor, Lake Peace) is believed to have drained first into Lake Agassiz", an even larger lake to the southeast, "then into the Arctic Ocean via the Mackenzie River, then back into Lake Agassiz, and then back to the Arctic Ocean" at various times in its history. Between 9,000 and 8,000 years ago, it divided to form Great Slave Lake and Lake Athabasca. These two and Great Bear Lake are considered its 'daughter' lakes.

See also
List of prehistoric lakes

References

External links
Map of Lake McConnell at 10 ka BP
A larger scale map, with "L. Mc." in the upper left

Former lakes of North America
Proglacial lakes